The first V8SuperTourer race was at Hampton Downs on February 18, 2012 with Greg Murphy taking the first ever race win.

Records

Starts

Race starts

Race wins

Total race wins

Percentage wins

Most wins in a season

Most race wins at the same track

Most consecutive race wins

Youngest winners

Oldest winners

Event wins

Total event wins

Pole positions

Total pole positions

Podium Finishes

Total podium finishes

Team records

Wins

Total race wins

Total Round wins

Podiums

Total podiums

Note: bold text indicates active drivers, teams and manufacturers.
 * Figures accurate to Round 4 ITM Auckland 500 2014.

Results 2012-2014 sourced from:

List of V8SuperTourer Championship Winners – Overall

List of V8SuperTourer Championship Winners – Sprint Series

List of V8SuperTourer Championship Winners – Endurance Series

References

Auto racing lists